John Howard (born John Richard Cox Jr.; April 14, 1913 – February 19, 1995) was an American actor. He is best remembered for his roles in the films Lost Horizon (1937) and The Philadelphia Story (1940).

Howard played Bulldog Drummond in seven films which were produced by Paramount. He also appeared in many television series and received a star on the Hollywood Walk of Fame.

Early life 
Born in Cleveland, Ohio, Howard was a Phi Beta Kappa graduate of what now is Case Western Reserve University. At college he discovered a love for the theater, and took part in student productions.

One night, a talent scout from Paramount was in Cleveland to see the local stock company. The show was not on that night, so the scout decided to go and see a production at the local university. He was impressed by Howard in a production of John Brown's Body and arranged for a screen test.

Career

Paramount
Howard became a contract player for Paramount under the name of "Jon Cox". He appeared  uncredited in One Hour Late (1934). Small roles followed in Car 99 (1935) and Four Hours to Kill! (1935).

He changed his name to John Howard and had a bigger part in Annapolis Farewell (1935).

Leading man
Paramount promoted him to a leading man in just his fourth film, Millions in the Air (1935), though it was a "B" movie.

He was second billed in Soak the Rich (1936), made for Paramount by the team of Ben Hecht and Charles MacArthur.

Paramount put him in an "A" feature, 13 Hours by Air (1936), and he was fourth billed in the credits. He starred in Border Flight (1936) alongside Frances Farmer and had a good part in Valiant Is the Word for Carrie (1936), with Gladys George.

Howard also starred in the comedy Easy to Take (1936) with Marsha Hunt.

According to David Shipman, "Howard..., was tried out in various capacities – supporting roles in As, leads in Bs, and on loan-outs. These last could be significant: the smaller studios had restricted contract lists and were prepared to pay well to borrow good-looking guys whose acting consisted mainly of not bumping into the furniture".

Lost Horizon
Howard's first memorable role came on loan out to Columbia: as Ronald Colman's younger brother in Lost Horizon (1937), directed by Frank Capra. Capra had seen him in Annapolis Farewell and arranged for a screen test. The film was a huge success and really established Howard, who later said "without Lost Horizon I doubt very much whether I would have survived in Hollywood".

Howard was borrowed by Universal for the lead in Let Them Live (1937). Back at Paramount, he supported Bob Burns and Martha Raye in Mountain Music (1937).

At RKO, Howard did Hitting a New High (1937) with Lily Pons and Jack Oakie. Columbia used him in Penitentiary (1938) with Walter Connolly.

He and Lew Ayres were in a buddy comedy, Hold 'Em Navy (1937), then Howard supported Lloyd Nolan and Shirley Ross in Prison Farm (1938) and starred in Touchdown, Army (1938) and Grand Jury Secrets (1939).

Bulldog Drummond
Since 1937, Paramount had made a series of "B" movies about daring adventurer Bulldog Drummond. The first of the actors to play the role, Ray Milland, was in Bulldog Drummond Escapes (1937). Milland was being groomed for more important pictures, so the studio offered the role of the British hero, Captain Hugh Drummond, to John Howard. Howard was himself not British, so he chose not to attempt a British accent, relying instead on diction to get the idea across. In his first performance as Drummond, Bulldog Drummond Comes Back (1937), Howard took second billing to John Barrymore, who played Inspector Nielson of Scotland Yard. According to Shipman, Howard "proved himself a resourceful, debonair, and witty player, his double-breasted suits and trilbies an admirable choice." Howard continued opposite Barrymore in Bulldog Drummond's Revenge (1937), and Bulldog Drummond's Peril (1938). H. B. Warner replaced Barrymore in Bulldog Drummond in Africa (1938),  Arrest Bulldog Drummond (1939), Bulldog Drummond's Secret Police (1939), and Bulldog Drummond's Bride (1939), the last in the series. As Shipman said, about the Drummond films, "[The] titles, splendidly, had nothing to do with the plots (since Drummond was never captured, there was nowhere to escape from) and the inconsequence was pleasing... All the while the spider's-web plots (of death threats, disguises, ambushes, sobbing women and booby-trapped motor-cars) hurtled to the screen – under various directors – with superior production values. They are more enjoyable than competitors featuring the Falcon, Charlie Chan, the Lone Wolf, Sexton Blake et al. due in part to Howard's insouciant playing".

The Philadelphia Story

Howard made What a Life (1939) with Betty Grable and Disputed Passage (1940) with Dorothy Lamour. The latter was a flop at the box office, and Paramount began to cool on Howard.

Universal borrowed him to play a key role in Green Hell (1940). MGM used him in The Man from Dakota (1940), supporting Wallace Beery, and The Philadelphia Story (1940), where he played the fiancé of Katharine Hepburn, competing for her amorous attentions with characters played by Cary Grant and James Stewart. It remains one of his best-known films.

Back at Paramount, Howard was top-billed in Texas Rangers Ride Again (1940). Universal borrowed him to play the leading man in The Invisible Woman (1941) with Barrymore and Virginia Bruce.

At Paramount, he supported Basil Rathbone in The Mad Doctor (1941), then Universal gave him the lead in Tight Shoes (1941). At RKO, he supported Adolphe Menjou and Gloria Swanson in Father Takes a Wife (1941), then at Columbia he was Joan Blondell's leading man in the farce comedy Three Girls About Town (1941).

Howard was top billed in Republic Pictures' A Tragedy at Midnight (1942). At Columbia, he had the starring role in The Man Who Returned to Life (1942), and Submarine Raider (1942), then he did Isle of Missing Men (1942) for Monogram Pictures.

Howard wanted to join the navy, but there was a delay after he signed a contract with 20th Century Fox, who put him in The Undying Monster (1942), in which he was third billed.

Military service
Howard served in the United States Navy as a lieutenant during World War II, later becoming an executive officer aboard the minesweeper USS YMS-24, aboard which he participated in landing operations at the Allied invasion of Sicily, Allied invasion of Italy, and Anzio, and deception operations against the island of Sardinia and in "Operation Dragoon" on the South coast of Vichy France. During 'Operation Dragoon' off the French coast on August 16, 1944 USS YMS-24 struck a sea mine, the blast killing its captain and severely damaging the ship. Howard took command and fought to save the ship, jumping into the sea several times to save crew members who had fallen overboard. For his actions he was awarded both the United States' Navy Cross and the French Croix de Guerre.

Return to acting

Upon his return to Hollywood, Howard struggled to re-establish himself. He was told that Fox had no projects for him, so he ended his contract with them to do a play -- which closed out of town.  "It was a long, long period of absolute dearth," he later said.

He had support parts in Love from a Stranger (1947) for Bryan Foy at Eagle-Lion Films and I, Jane Doe (1948) for Republic.

He starred in Public Prosecutor, the first dramatic TV drama series shot on film. It was filmed in 1947 but not shown until several years later. Public Prosecutor was ultimately broadcast as part of Crawford Mystery Theatre in 1951.

He was in "Entrapment" on NBC Presents in 1949.

Howard supported John Wayne in The Fighting Kentuckian (1949) for Republic and had the lead in Radar Secret Service (1950) for the low-budget Lippert Pictures.

Howard guest-starred on shows like Lights Out, The Bigelow Theatre and Pulitzer Prize Playhouse and had leads in low-budget films like Experiment Alcatraz (1950).

Howard was in Models Inc. (1952) and Make Haste to Live (1954) and guest starred on Schlitz Playhouse, Suspense, Four Star Playhouse, and The Loretta Young Show. His first high-profile film in a long while came when he played Laraine Day's husband in The High and the Mighty (1954).

Howard made his Broadway debut in 1953 in Hazel Flagg  where he met his future wife, the ballerina and actress Eva Ralf.

Television star
Howard continued to work in TV appearing in General Electric Theater, The Pepsi-Cola Playhouse, The Millionaire, The Whistler, The Ford Television Theatre, The Star and the Story, Science Fiction Theatre, Studio 57, Fireside Theatre, TV Reader's Digest, Front Row Center, and Lux Video Theatre.

He had the lead in a series, Dr. Hudson's Secret Journal (1955–57). The series raised Howard's profile, and he was offered the lead in The Unknown Terror (1957). In 1958 he starred in another TV series, Adventures of the Sea Hawk, which ran for 26 episodes.

1960s
Howard's 1960s acting work included guest spots on Lawman, Wagon Train, Men into Space, Cheyenne, The Magical World of Disney, The Americans, Outlaws, Gunslinger, Lock Up, Bronco, Surfside 6, 77 Sunset Strip, Rawhide, Hawaiian Eye, Perry Mason, Branded, Profiles in Courage, Days of Our Lives, and The Lucy Show, and The Legend of Jesse James.

He formed a friendship with Fred MacMurray, star of the TV series My Three Sons who, like Howard, had worked in Paramount features of the 1930s. Howard was a regular guest star on the show, playing MacMurray's boss. Series producer Don Fedderson used Howard in his other series, Family Affair and To Rome with Love. Howard also had roles in the feature films Destination Inner Space (1966) and The Destructors (1967).

1970s
Howard could be seen in Eye for an Eye (1971),  The Bold Ones: The New Doctors, Mission: Impossible, Buck and the Preacher (1972), The Brady Bunch, Mod Squad, The ABC Afternoon Playbreak, The New Perry Mason, So Evil, My Sister, Capone (1975), Little House on the Prairie, Bronk, Wonder Woman, Police Woman and The Rockford Files.

Filmography

Television

References

Bibliography
Wise, James. Stars in Blue: Movie Actors in America's Sea Services. Annapolis, Maryland: Naval Institute Press, 1997.

External links

John Howard at Virtual History
Navy Cross citation

1913 births
1995 deaths
American male film actors
American male television actors
United States Navy personnel of World War II
United States Navy officers
Recipients of the Navy Cross (United States)
Male actors from Cleveland
Military personnel from Cleveland
Case Western Reserve University alumni
Recipients of the Croix de Guerre 1939–1945 (France)
Male actors from Los Angeles
20th-century American male actors